George Edward Pfister (September 4, 1918 – August 14, 1997) was an American catcher, coach and executive in Major League Baseball. He served in the United States Army Air Forces during World War II.

Pfister appeared in one game for the Brooklyn Dodgers during the  season. On September 27, he was hitless in two at bats against Ike Pearson in a 7–3 loss to the Philadelphia Phillies at Ebbets Field.

Pfister was a coach for the Dodgers in 1952, a minor-league manager in the Brooklyn organization for five seasons between 1948 and 1957, a front office official for minor league clubs, and the farm system director of the New York Yankees from 1965–1974. He spent 23 years working in baseball operations for Major League Baseball. In 1991, Pfister was presented with the King of Baseball award given by Minor League Baseball.

Born in Bound Brook, New Jersey, Pfister died of a heart attack at the age of 78 at Somerset Hospital on August 14, 1997.

References

External links

1918 births
1997 deaths
American expatriate baseball players in Canada
United States Army Air Forces personnel of World War II
Baseball players from New Jersey
Brooklyn Dodgers coaches
Brooklyn Dodgers players
Durham Bulls players
Fort Worth Cats players
Hazleton Dodgers players
Lexington Indians players
Macon Dodgers players
Major League Baseball catchers
Major League Baseball farm directors
Minor league baseball managers
Montreal Royals players
New York Yankees executives
People from Bound Brook, New Jersey
Pueblo Dodgers players
Pulaski Counts players
Reading Chicks players
Sportspeople from Somerset County, New Jersey